The World Day to Combat Desertification and Drought is a United Nations observance celebrated each year on 17 June.  Its purpose is to raise awareness of the presence of desertification and drought, highlighting methods of preventing desertification and recovering from drought.  Each year's global celebration has a unique, novel emphasis that had not been developed previously.

This day was proclaimed by the United Nations General Assembly resolution A/RES/49/115 on January 30, 1995, after the day when United Nations Convention to Combat Desertification is drafted.

Desertification and the Sustainable Development Goals
The 2030 Agenda for Sustainable Development declares that "we are determined to protect the planet from degradation, including through sustainable consumption and production, sustainably managing its natural resources and taking urgent action on climate change, so that it can support the needs of the present and future generations".  Specifically, SDG Goal 15: Life on Land states the resolve of the United Nations and the SDG signatory nations to halt and reverse land degradation.

Annual themes
 2022 - Rising up from drought together
 2021 - Restoration, land and recovery. We build back better with healthy land
 2020 - Food. Feed. Fibre - the links between consumption and land
 2019 - Let’s Grow the Future Together (Reflecting on 25 years of progress and envisaging to the next 25)
 2018 - Land has true value. Invest in it
 2017 - Link between land degradation and migration (in light of Syrian mass emigration following environmentally-caused failure of Syria's agricultural system) #2017WDCD
 2016 - Protect Earth. Restore Land. Engage People.
 2015 - Attainment of food security for all through sustainable food systems. - "No such thing as a free lunch. Invest in healthy soil"
 2009 - Conserving land and energy = Securing our common future
 2008 - Combating land degradation for sustainable agriculture
 2007 - Desertification and Climate Change - One Global Challenge
 2006 - The Beauty of Deserts – The Challenge of Desertification
 2005 - Women and Desertification
 2004 - Social Dimensions of Desertification: Migration and Poverty
 2003 - International Year of Deserts and Desertification (IYDD)
 2002 - Land Degradation

References

External links
 World Day to Combat Desertification and Drought
 United Nations Convention to Combat Desertification

June observances
United Nations days
Desertification
1995 introductions